Quantrill's Raiders is a 1958 American CinemaScope Western film directed by Edward Bernds and starring Steve Cochran, Diane Brewster and Leo Gordon.

Plot
A Civil War guerilla gang plans an attack on a Kansas arsenal.

Cast
 Steve Cochran as Wes 
 Diane Brewster as Sue
 Leo Gordon as Quantrill
 Gale Robbins as Kate
 Will Wright as Judge
 Kim Charney as Joel
 Myron Healey as Jarrett
 Robert Foulk as Hager
 Glenn Strange as Todd
 Lane Chandler as Sheriff
 Guy Prescott as Major
 Thomas Browne Henry as Griggs (as Thomas b. Henry)

External links
 

1958 films
American Western (genre) films
Films directed by Edward Bernds
1950s English-language films
Allied Artists films
CinemaScope films
1958 Western (genre) films
1950s American films